Mamoutou Touré (born 1 July 1957) is a Malian football administrator who is a member of the FIFA Council in 2021. He has also been the president of the Malian Football Federation since August 2019.

References

1957 births
Living people
Association football in Africa
FIFA
People from Bamako
21st-century Malian people